Dragutin Vragović (18 September 1897 – 23 January 1973) was a Croatian footballer who spent the majority of his career with Građanski Zagreb in the 1920s. Vragović won two Yugoslav championships with Građanski (1923 and 1926) and was also member of the Yugoslav squad at the 1920 and 1924 Olympic tournaments.

Career
Vragović was known as a reliable utility player at Građanski and performed well in centre back, midfielder and striker roles, in addition to playing as either left or right winger for the national team. He was also Građanski's captain in both of their successful Yugoslav championship campaigns in 1923 and 1926, and was one of their best players when the club toured abroad and defeated Barcelona and Athletic Bilbao in 1923.

He also had 18 appearances for Zagreb XI (1920–1928) and was capped 7 times for Kingdom of Yugoslavia (1920–1923). He was called up for the team's first international tournament, at the 1920 Olympics in Antwerp, and he appeared in the country's first ever international match on 28 August 1920, a 7–0 defeat to Czechoslovakia. He was also an unused substitute at the 1924 Olympics. His final international was an October 1923 friendly match against Czechoslovakia.

Honours
Kingdom of Yugoslavia Championship (2): 1923, 1926

References

External links
 

Dragutin Vragović at Reprezentacija.rs 

1897 births
1973 deaths
Footballers from Zagreb
People from the Kingdom of Croatia-Slavonia
Association football midfielders
Yugoslav footballers
Yugoslavia international footballers
Footballers at the 1920 Summer Olympics
Footballers at the 1924 Summer Olympics
Olympic footballers of Yugoslavia
HŠK Građanski Zagreb players
Yugoslav First League players